Seskar Furö is an uninhabited island in the northeast of the Swedish sector of the Bay of Bothnia. It is now part of a national park.

Location

Seskar Furö is the second largest island in the Haparanda Archipelago National Park, in the Haparanda archipelago, to the west of  the Finnish Perämeri National Park. 
All of the islands in the Haparanda archipelago have emerged in the last 1,500 years or so, as the bed of the bay has risen due to post-glacial rebound following the last ice age.

The island is sandy, with large dunes on the western shores. It is mostly covered by relatively undisturbed pine forests.
There are remains of a former fishing village, including a turf maze.

References

Sources

Swedish islands in the Baltic
Islands of Norrbotten County
Uninhabited islands of Sweden